Thanks is a 2011 American comedy film directed by Martin Bergman and starring Paul Dooley and Rita Rudner. The film premiered at the 2011 Palm Springs International Film Festival.

Premise
Thanks is a Thanksgiving comedy that proves blood is thicker than gravy as a family deals with change over three Thanksgivings spent at the California beach. Three adult children respond to their father remarrying a much younger woman as America and the world respond to the tumultuous 2008 economic upheaval.

Cast
 Paul Dooley as Hank
 Rita Rudner as Bunny
 Steve Purnick as Steve
 Brian Lohmann as Brian
 Edi Patterson as Edi
 Kelly Holden as Kelly

References

External links
 
 

2011 films
2011 comedy films
American comedy films
2010s English-language films
2010s American films